Aflatoxins are various poisonous carcinogens and mutagens that are produced by certain molds, particularly Aspergillus species. The fungi grow in soil, decaying vegetation and various staple foodstuffs and commodities such as hay, sweetcorn, wheat, millet, sorghum, cassava, rice, chili peppers, cottonseed, peanuts, tree nuts, sesame seeds, sunflower seeds, and various spices. In short, the relevant fungi grow on almost any crop or food. When such contaminated food is processed or consumed, the aflatoxins enter the general food supply. They have been found in both pet and human foods, as well as in feedstocks for agricultural animals. Animals fed contaminated food can pass aflatoxin transformation products into eggs, milk products, and meat. For example, contaminated poultry feed is the suspected source of aflatoxin-contaminated chicken meat and eggs in Pakistan. 

Children are particularly affected by aflatoxin exposure, which is associated with stunted growth, delayed development, liver damage, and liver cancer. An association between childhood stunting and aflatoxin exposure has been reported in some studies but could not be detected in all. Furthermore, a causal relationship between childhood stunting and aflatoxin exposure has yet to be conclusively shown by epidemiological studies, though such investigations are under way. Adults have a higher tolerance to exposure, but are also at risk. No animal species is immune. Aflatoxins are among the most carcinogenic substances known. After entering the body, aflatoxins may be metabolized by the liver to a reactive epoxide intermediate or hydroxylated to become the less harmful aflatoxin M1.

Aflatoxin poisoning most commonly results from ingestion, but the most toxic aflatoxin compound, B1, can permeate through the skin.

The United States Food and Drug Administration (FDA) action levels for aflatoxin present in food or feed is 20 to 300 ppb. The FDA has had occasion to declare both human and pet food recalls as a precautionary measure to prevent exposure.

The term "aflatoxin" is derived from the name of the species Aspergillus flavus, in which some of the compounds first were discovered. The word was coined around 1960 after its discovery as the source of "Turkey X disease". Aflatoxins form one of the major groupings of mycotoxins, and apart from Aspergillus flavus various members of the group of compounds occur in species such as: Aspergillus parasiticus, Aspergillus pseudocaelatus, Aspergillus pseudonomius, and Aspergillus nomius.

Major types and their metabolites 

Aflatoxin B1 is considered the most toxic and is produced by both Aspergillus flavus and Aspergillus parasiticus. Aflatoxin M1 is present in the fermentation broth of Aspergillus parasiticus, but it and aflatoxin M2 are also produced when an infected liver metabolizes aflatoxin B1 and B2.

 Aflatoxin B1 and B2 (AFB), produced by Aspergillus flavus and A. parasiticus
 Aflatoxin G1 and G2 (AFG), produced by some Group II A. flavus and Aspergillus parasiticus
 Aflatoxin M1 (AFM1), metabolite of aflatoxin B1 in humans and animals (exposure in ng levels may come from a mother's milk)
 Aflatoxin M2, metabolite of aflatoxin B2 in milk of cattle fed on contaminated foods
 Aflatoxicol (AFL): metabolite produced by breaking down the lactone ring
 Aflatoxin Q1 (AFQ1), major metabolite of AFB1 in in vitro liver preparations of other higher vertebrates

AFM, AFQ, and AFL retain the possibility to become an epoxide. Nevertheless, they appear much less capable of causing mutagenesis than the unmetabolized toxin.

Contamination conditions 

Aflatoxins are produced by both Aspergillus flavus and Aspergillus parasiticus, which are common forms of 'weedy' molds widespread in nature. The presence of those molds does not always indicate that harmful levels of aflatoxin are present, but does indicate a significant risk. The molds can colonize and contaminate food before harvest or during storage, especially following prolonged exposure to a high-humidity environment, or to stressful conditions such as drought. Aflatoxin contamination is increasing in crops such as maize as a result of climate change creating better conditions for these molds.

The native habitat of Aspergillus is in soil, decaying vegetation, hay, and grains undergoing microbiological deterioration, but it invades all types of organic substrates whenever conditions are favorable for its growth. Favorable conditions for production of aflatoxins include high moisture content (at least 7%) and temperatures from 55 °F (13 °C) to 104 °F (40 °C) [optimum 27 to 30 °C (81 to 86 °F)]. Aflatoxins have been isolated from all major cereal crops, and from sources as diverse as peanut butter and cannabis. The staple commodities regularly contaminated with aflatoxins include cassava, chilies, corn, cotton seed, millet, peanuts, rice, sorghum, sunflower seeds, tree nuts, wheat, and a variety of spices intended for human or animal consumption. Aflatoxin transformation products are sometimes found in eggs, milk products, and meat when animals are fed contaminated grains.

A study conducted in Kenya and Mali found that the predominant practices for drying and storage of maize were inadequate in minimizing exposure to aflatoxins.

Organic crops, which are not treated with fungicides, may be more susceptible to contamination with aflatoxins.

Prevention

A primary means of limiting risk from aflatoxins in the food supply is food hygiene in the commercial commodity supply chain, such as rejecting moldy grain for use in food processing plants and testing of batches of ingredients for aflatoxin levels before adding them to the mix. Regulatory agencies such as the FDA set limits on acceptable levels. Grain drying itself, which is necessary for viable combine harvesting in many regions, lays the fundamentals for this effort by preventing stored grain from being too damp in the first place. 

There is very limited evidence to show that agricultural and nutritional education can reduce exposure to aflatoxin in low to middle income countries.

Pathology

No animal species is known to be immune to the acute toxic effects of aflatoxins. Adult humans have a high tolerance for aflatoxin exposure and rarely succumb to acute aflatoxicosis, but children are particularly affected, and their exposure can lead to stunted growth and delayed development, in addition to all the symptoms mentioned below.

High-level aflatoxin exposure produces an acute hepatic necrosis (acute aflatoxicosis), resulting later in cirrhosis or carcinoma of the liver. Acute liver failure is made manifest by bleeding, edema, alteration in digestion, changes to the absorption and/or metabolism of nutrients, and mental changes and/or coma.

Chronic, subclinical exposure does not lead to symptoms so dramatic as acute aflatoxicosis. Chronic exposure increases the risk of developing liver and gallbladder cancer, as aflatoxin metabolites may intercalate into DNA and alkylate the bases through epoxide moiety. This is thought to cause mutations in the p53 gene, an important gene in preventing cell cycle progression when there are DNA mutations, or signaling apoptosis (programmed cell death). These mutations seem to affect some base pair locations more than others, for example, the third base of codon 249 of the p53 gene appears to be more susceptible to aflatoxin-mediated mutations than nearby bases. As with other DNA-alkylating agents, Aflatoxin B1 can cause immune suppression, and exposure to it is associated with an increased viral load in HIV positive individuals.

The expression of aflatoxin-related diseases is influenced by factors such as species, age, nutrition, sex, and the possibility of concurrent exposure to other toxins. The main target organ in mammals is the liver, so aflatoxicosis primarily is a hepatic disease. Conditions increasing the likelihood of aflatoxicosis in humans include limited availability of food, environmental conditions that favour mould growth on foodstuffs, and lack of regulatory systems for aflatoxin monitoring and control.

A regular diet including apiaceous vegetables, such as carrots, parsnips, celery, and parsley may reduce the carcinogenic effects of aflatoxin.

There is no specific antidote for aflatoxicosis. Symptomatic and supportive care tailored to the severity of the liver disease may include intravenous fluids with dextrose, active vitamin K, B vitamins, and a restricted, but high-quality protein diet with adequate carbohydrate content.

In other animals 
In dogs, aflatoxin has potential to lead to liver disease. Low levels of aflatoxin exposure require continuous consumption for several weeks to months in order for signs of liver dysfunction to appear. Some articles have suggested the toxic level in dog food is 100–300 ppb and requires continuous exposure or consumption for a few weeks to months to develop aflatoxicosis. No information is available to suggest that recovered dogs will later succumb to an aflatoxin-induced disease.

Turkeys are extremely susceptible to aflatoxicosis. Recent studies have revealed that this is due to the efficient cytochrome P450 mediated metabolism of aflatoxin B1 in the liver of turkeys and deficient glutathione-S-transferase mediated detoxification.

Some studies on pregnant hamsters showed a significant relationship between exposure of aflatoxin B1 (4 mg/kg, single dose) and the appearance of developmental anomalies in their offspring.

In 2005, Diamond Pet Foods discovered aflatoxin in a product manufactured at their facility in Gaston, South Carolina. In 23 states, Diamond voluntarily recalled 19 products formulated with corn and manufactured in the Gaston facility. Testing of more than 2,700 finished product samples conducted by laboratories confirmed that only two date codes of two adult dog formulas had the potential to be toxic.

In December 2020 and January 2021, Midwestern Pet Foods recalled dog food that contained fatal levels of aflatoxin. As many as 70 dogs had died from aflatoxin poisoning by January 12, 2021.

Detection in humans 
There are two principal techniques that have been used most often to detect levels of aflatoxin in humans.

The first method is measuring the AFB1-guanine adduct in the urine of subjects. The presence of this breakdown product indicates exposure to aflatoxin B1 during the past 24 hours. This technique measures only recent exposure, however. Due to the half-life of this metabolite, the level of AFB1-guanine measured may vary from day to day, based on diet, it is not ideal for assessing long-term exposure.

Another technique that has been used is a measurement of the AFB1-albumin adduct level in the blood serum. This approach provides a more integrated measure of exposure over several weeks or months.

List of outbreaks

International sources of commercial peanut butter, cooking oils (e.g. olive, peanut and sesame oil), and cosmetics have been identified as contaminated with aflatoxin. In some instances, liquid chromatography–tandem mass spectrometry (LC–MS/MS), and other analytical methods, revealed a range from 48% to 80% of selected product samples as containing detectable quantities of aflatoxin. In many of these contaminated food products, the aflatoxin exceeded the safe limits of the U.S. Food and Drug Administration (FDA), or other regulatory agency.
 1973 Poland: 10 died following the opening of the Tomb of Casimir IV Jagiellon, which contained Aflatoxin-producing molds. 
 2003 Kenya: acute poisoning, 120 confirmed deaths.
 February–March 2013: Romania, Serbia, Croatia imported into western Europe – 2013 aflatoxin contamination.
 February 2013: Iowa contamination.
 2014 (ongoing): Nepal and Bangladesh, neonatal exposures, found in umbilical cord blood.
2019 Kenya: five brands of maize flour recalled due to contamination.
2021 USA: Contamination of pet food manufactured by Midwestern Pet Food, causing the deaths of at least 70 dogs.

See also 
 Aflatoxin total synthesis
 2013 aflatoxin contamination
 Mycotoxins in animal feed
 Sterigmatocystin, a related toxin
 Nixtamalization
 Other ways in which aspergillus can cause disease in mammals: 
 Aspergillosis
 Primary cutaneous aspergillosis

Resources

External links 

 Detailed listing and information on all Aspergillus mycotoxins
 Aflatoxin, ICRISAT
 Aspergillusflavus.org
 Aflatoxins – Cancer-Causing Substance
 Aflatoxin B1